Cristina Pujol Bajo (born 5 May 1993) is a Spanish competitive sailor.

She competed in the laser radial event at the 2020 Summer Olympics, held July–August 2021 in Tokyo.

Notes

References

External links
 
 
 

 

1993 births
Living people
Spanish female sailors (sport)
Olympic sailors of Spain
Sailors at the 2020 Summer Olympics – Laser Radial
People from Sant Cugat del Vallès
Sportspeople from the Province of Barcelona